Deminsky is a rural locality (a khutor) and the administrative center of Deminskoye Rural Settlement, Novoanninsky District, Volgograd Oblast, Russia. The population was 839 as of 2010. There are 8 streets.

Geography 
Deminsky is located in steppe on the Khopyorsko-Buzulukskaya Plain, 37 km northwest of Novoanninsky (the district's administrative centre) by road. Kosovsky is the nearest rural locality.

References 

Rural localities in Novoanninsky District